The sixth season of the Brazilian competitive reality television series MasterChef premiered on March 24, 2019 at 8:00 p.m. on Band.

The grand prize was R$250.000, a scholarship on Le Cordon Bleu in Paris, France, a year's supply on Carrefour worth R$1.000 per month, a complete kitchen of the new Brastemp Gourmand line, a Tramontina kit of pots, knives, barbecue and small home appliances by Breville, a tour to the Pasta World Championship 2019 in Paris, courtesy by Barilla and the MasterChef trophy.

A scholarship on Le Cordon Bleu in Ottawa, Canada and a year's supply on Carrefour worth R$1.000 per month was awarded to the runner-up. A scholarship on Le Cordon Bleu in São Paulo was awarded to Brazil's favorite contestant via an online vote on Band.com.

Environmental engineer Rodrigo Massoni won the competition over nurse Lorena Dayse on August 25, 2019. Haila Santuá received 84.18% of the public vote over the other sixteen eliminated contestants and won the special prize. This was the first and only season of MasterChef Brasil broadcast on Sunday nights.

Contestants

Top 19

Elimination table

Key

Ratings and reception

Brazilian ratings
All numbers are in points and provided by Kantar Ibope Media.

References

External links
 MasterChef on Band

2019 Brazilian television seasons
MasterChef (Brazilian TV series)